ROKS Eulji Mundeok (DDH-972) is the second ship of the Gwangaetto the Great-class in the Republic of Korea Navy. She is named after Eulji Mundeok.

Development 
The KDX-I was designed to replace the old destroyers in the ROKN that were transferred from the US Navy in the 1950s and 1960s. It was thought to be a major turning point for the ROKN in that the launching of the first KDX-I meant that ROKN finally had a capability to project power far from its shores. After the launching of the ship, there was a massive boom in South Korean international participation against piracy and military operations other than war.

Construction and career 
ROKS Eulji Mundeok was launched on 16 October 1997 by Daewoo Shipbuilding and commissioned on 30 August 1999.

RIMPAC 2000 
ROKS Eulji Mundeok and ROKS Jeon Nam participated in RIMPAC 2000. Both ships joined USS Abraham Lincoln Battle Group along with ships from Australia, Chile, Japan, Canada, and South Korea steam alongside one another.

RIMPAC 2004 
ROKS Chungmugong Yi Sun-sin and ROKS Eulji Mundeok joined RIMPAC 2004 which  included 40 ships, seven submarines, 100 aircraft, and nearly 18,000 military personnel from seven navies, including Canada, Australia, Japan, South Korea, Chile, and the United Kingdom. Both ships were part of USS John C. Stennis’ Battle Group during the exercise.

ROKS Eulji Mundeok was proudly honored as the top gunnery ship of the year in 2014.

References 

Gwanggaeto the Great-class destroyers 
1997 ships 
Ships built by Daewoo Shipbuilding & Marine Engineering